Formal diplomatic relations between Georgia and the United Kingdom can be traced back to at least 1919, during the First Georgian Republic. After the defeat of German Empire, Georgia's ally, in WWI, parts of Georgia came under British administration and British troops were also stationed in Tiflis to stave off the Bolshevik invasion. This lasted until 1920, when Britain left due to a variety of geopolitical factors. 

In the present day, Georgia-UK relations remain very cordial and the two countries cooperate closely in a manner similar to the Georgian-American relations. "Georgia is a strategic partner to the UK" and since 2019, relations between the two countries are streamlined by the "UK-Georgia Strategic Partnership and Cooperation Agreement", which largely replaced the EU-Georgia Association Agreement following Brexit. Both countries maintain embassies in the respective capitals.

History

Britain recognized the Democratic Republic of Georgia in 1919. Sir Oliver Wardrop served as the United Kingdom's first Chief Commissioner for Transcaucasia in Georgia from 1919–21. He was welcomed by the government of Noe Zhordania, who supported Wardrop's a efforts to promote Georgian culture and gather support from western nations. During this period, Britain came to view Georgia in a rather favorable light, setting it apart from Bolshevik Russia, as well as some of its neighbors: 

British military presence in Georgia had to come to an end in 1920 because of neutrality clauses in the Treaty of Moscow, in which Russia recognized Georgia's independence in exchange for Georgia not hosting forces hostile to Russia's interests. Now that there were no Western powers in Georgia, in February 1921 the Bolshevik Red Army proceeded to invade the country, leading to Georgia's defeat and collapse by March of that year. Even after Soviet takeover, Britain - along with France, Belgium, and Poland - continued to recognize only the Georgian government; this lasted until the 1930s, when growing Soviet power and political processes in Europe made it impractical to do so indefinitely.

In April 1987, Margaret Thatcher, the British prime minister, made an official state visit to the Soviet Union, on the last day of which she visited the Georgian SSR, specifically Tbilisi. It was the first visit of its kind to Georgia. She was hosted by First Secretary of the Georgian Communist Party Jumber Patiashvili. She was met with crowds in the capital, with Thatcher greeting onlookers with the word "gamarojobat". She also attended a wedding at the Palace of Rituals, where she gave the bride and the groom a porcelain bowl. In the evening, she attended a dinner hosted by Chairman of the Council of Ministers Otar Cherkezia and other regional officials, during which she noted the similarity in cultures, notably the shared patronage of Saint George.

Following the restoration of Georgian independence in 1991, official diplomatic relations between Georgia and the UK were re-established in 1992, and a full UK embassy opened in Tbilisi three years later. In response to the Russo-Georgian War, the British government showed solidarity with Georgia, with the Foreign and Commonwealth Office releasing a statement calling for calm and Foreign Secretary David Miliband saying the following: "Russia has extended the fighting today well beyond South Ossetia, attacking the Georgian port of Poti, and the town of Gori, while Abkhaz forces have been shelling Georgian positions in the Upper Kodori valley. I deplore this." On 10 August 2008, pro-Georgian protesters protested in front of the Russian embassy in London. On 21-25 May 2006, Prime Minister Zurab Nogaideli visited the United Kingdom. In November 2015, former Prime Minister Tony Blair visited Georgia, being hosted by Prime Minister Irakli Garibashvili, who accompanied him to sights such as Mtatsminda Hill.

Economic ties
The European Bank for Reconstruction and Development (EBRD) based in the UK plays an important role in the development of the Georgian economy. The UK is one of the largest investors in Georgia. In 2017, it was third on the list with direct investments, having invested a total of $250 million that year. The twin cities of Tbilisi and Bristol, Newport and Kutaisi have affected the impact tourism has, with there being a 40% increase in British tourists to Georgia in 2017. Former British Army officer and former Leader of the Conservatives in the European Parliament Geoffrey Van Orden said that in terms of economic relations, Georgia was one of the "first of our friends to back post-Brexit Britain and seek a close future partnership".

Defense and security ties

Britain has a history of working with the Georgian Armed Forces during the War in Afghanistan, where Georgia has long been the largest non-NATO troop contributor. After the United States, Britain, and their East European allies failed to secure NATO membership plan for Georgia in 2008, the British government floated proposals to help Georgia join the military alliance through alternative means without necessarily needing the formal membership plan. These British efforts were ultimately not successful due to opposition from a subset of countries led by France and Germany.

In March 2016, parallel to British troops participating in multilateral exercises in Georgia, the British Armed Forces announced the creation of additional defence attaché posts in Georgia. 

In 2016, Georgia sided with UK's diplomatic efforts against Russia in response to the Salisbury chemical attack by Russian intelligence services and also supported UK initiatives for strengthening the Organisation for the Prohibition of Chemical Weapons (OPCW). Because Georgia and Russia had already severed diplomatic relations in 2008, and officially there were no longer any Russian diplomats present in Georgia, in show of support for the UK, Georgia expelled a Russian official operating in the country under the nominal auspices of Switzerland.

In February 2020, UK's National Cyber Security Centre, operating under the aegis of GCHQ, helped expose Russian Military Intelligence hacking activities directed against Georgia. The British government noted that Russia "conducted these cyber-attacks in an attempt to undermine Georgia’s sovereignty, to sow discord and disrupt the lives of ordinary Georgian people. The UK remains unwavering in its support for Georgia’s sovereignty and territorial integrity"

Royal Navy destroyers make regular port calls in Georgia to show support and/or conduct bilateral trainings. Some travel routes used by the Royal Navy to make such visits have attracted controversy and anger from Russia. Commander of HMS Defender rebuffed these complaints, stating the Royal Navy is committed to "providing reassurances and security in the region, and incredible deterrence to those who seek to undermine global security...and Georgia's territorial integrity and sovereignty".

At the 2022 Madrid summit, the UK Prime Minister Boris Johnson announced more than £5 million in additional support to enhance Georgia's cyber capabilities, reasoning that the "people of Georgia live every day on the frontline of Russian aggression. Putin cannot be allowed to use Georgia’s sovereign institutions to sharpen the knife of his cyber capability."

Commonwealth War Graves
There is a British Military Cemetery in Batumi, Georgia, where 68 Britons are buried. There is a small memorial listing the names of the deceased. It gets periodic visits from the UK, including the Royal Navy.

Resident diplomatic missions
 Georgia has an embassy in London.
 United Kingdom has an embassy in Tbilisi.

See also
 Foreign relations of Georgia
 Foreign relations of the United Kingdom 
 Georgians in Europe

References

 
Georgia
United Kingdom